Pustków may refer to the following places in Poland:
Pustków, Lower Silesian Voivodeship (south-west Poland)
Pustków, Lubusz Voivodeship (west Poland)
Pustków, Opole Voivodeship (south-west Poland)
Pustków, Podkarpackie Voivodeship (south-east Poland)